is one of the private junior Colleges located at Aoi-ku, Shizuoka in Japan. It was previously located in Minato, Tokyo and Kumamoto, Kumamoto campus. It was established in 1952 and closed in 2021.

Department and Graduate Course

Departments 
 Department of management information science
 Department of food and nutrition
 Department of children's education

External links
 Tokai University Junior College

Private universities and colleges in Japan
Japanese junior colleges
Universities and colleges in Shizuoka Prefecture
Buildings and structures in Shizuoka (city)
Educational institutions disestablished in 2021
2021 disestablishments in Japan